These are the squads for the countries that played in the 1956 South American Championship. The participating countries were Argentina, Brazil, Chile, Paraguay, Peru and Uruguay.

Argentina
Head Coach:  Guillermo Stábile

Brazil
Head Coach:  Vicente Feola

Chile
Head Coach:  Luis Tirado

Paraguay
Head Coach:

Peru
Head Coach:  Arturo Fernández

Uruguay
Head Coach:  Hugo Bagnulo

References

Squads
1956 South American Championship squads